DrinkWise Australia (DrinkWise) is an Australian social change organisation created to bring about healthier and safer drinking culture in Australia – where drinking alcohol excessively or drinking too young is considered undesirable. Utilising targeted, integrated and sustained social marketing approaches and developing practical education initiatives and resources allows DrinkWise to inform and support the community about responsible alcohol use.

DrinkWise's philosophy is founded on industry leadership and community partnerships. It is currently funded by voluntary contributions from alcohol industry participants and has in the past received both Coalition and Labour Government funding to support its work.

The organisation is governed by a board of eminent Australians with backgrounds including policing, public health, education, community service, academia, research and marketing. DrinkWise's alcohol industry contributors are also represented on its board.

History 
DrinkWise Australia was established in 2005 and then received $5 million in funding from the Federal Government as announced by the Parliamentary Secretary to the Minister for Health and Ageing in the then Australian Government, the Hon Christopher Pyne MP.

Board Members 

Under the DrinkWise constitution, the board must comprise eight (8) community members and six (6) industry representatives with the Chair being a community member. Current board members as of July 2022 are:

Community directors:
 Mr Neil Comrie AO, APM – Chair
 Hon. Kate Ellis
 Professor Niki Ellis OAM
 Hon. Rob Knowles AO
 Paul Sheahan AM
 Terry Slater AM
 Hon Amanda Vanstone
 Professor Judith Whitworth AC

Industry directors:
 Peter Hurley AO
 Robert Iervasi
 Angus McPherson
 Anubha Sahasrabuddhe
 Helen Strachan
 Michael Waters

Activities

Campaigns
To date, DrinkWise Australia has launched a range of social marketing campaigns and initiatives including Kids Absorb Your Drinking, Kids and Alcohol Don’t Mix, Drinking – Do it Properly and "You won't Miss a Moment...if you DrinkWise".

Kids Absorb Your Drinking
Launched in June 2008, the Kids Absorb Your Drinking campaign marked DrinkWise Australia’s initial step towards engaging generational change in attitudes to alcohol. The campaign was created to raise awareness of the importance of role-modelling behaviour of parents about their consumption of alcohol. In a 2008 media release, DrinkWise cites research that supports the view that there is a strong positive correlation between the way parents drink and how their children grow up to drink. According to DrinkWise, children form their attitudes towards alcohol a long time before they’ve had their first drink by observing how their parents and other adults around them drink.

Kids and Alcohol Don’t Mix
In 2010 the Kids and Alcohol Don’t Mix campaign alerted parents to emerging clinical research undertaken by Professor Ian Hickie at the Sydney University mind and brain institute that indicated that alcohol can cause damage to the developing adolescent brain. The campaign challenged parents to put aside any existing beliefs about introducing alcohol to their underage adolescents and to encourage them to delay their children’s introduction to alcohol for as long as possible. The campaign empowers parents with facts and tactics via the DrinkWise website.

Drinking – Do it Properly (18–24 year-old Campaign)
In 2014, DrinkWise Australia launched an Australian first campaign designed to influence young adults (18–24 years) to drink responsibly – by moderating the intensity and frequency of binge drinking occasions. The Drinking – Do it Properly campaign aims to make the ongoing trend of drinking to get drunk less socially acceptable among young drinkers, and to encourage those already drinking in safe and moderate ways. The campaign was developed in response to the prevalence of poor drinking choices by young Australians aged 18–24 years.  DrinkWise commissioned extensive quantitative and qualitative formative research as well as multiple rounds of concept testing research to ensure the campaign cut through with young adults. To date, the campaign has been in receipt of numerous international and Australian awards.

Commissioned research
Where a knowledge gap has existed DrinkWise Australia has commissioned independent academic research to ensure that its activities are underpinned by a sound evidence base:

 From Ideal to Reality: Cultural contradictions and young people’s drinking: The first stage of this project resulted in a literature review that collected a range of data that addressed the topic and was published in 2008. This report is the result of qualitative research undertaken by NCETA that examined the socio-cultural influences on 14 to 24-year-old Australians' drinking and the analysis provides useful insights to better understand these influences.
 Drinking patterns in Australia, 2001-2007: The Report is based on an analysis of data from 2001, 2004 and 2007 National Drug Strategy Household Surveys, and looks at trends in alcohol consumption, alcohol-related harm, alcohol beverage of choice, under-age drinking and factors associated with risky drinking populations.
 The influence of parents and siblings on children’s and adolescents’ alcohol use: a critical review of the literature: A consortium consisting of Monash, Newcastle and La Trobe Universities undertook this review to document and critique the existing evidence (available up to 2009) concerning the role of parents and older sibling’s behaviours, attitudes and use of alcohol in influencing their children’s/siblings’ attitudes, behaviour and use of alcohol, within the broader social environment.
 Alcohol and the Teenage Brain: Safest to keep them apart: Professor Ian Hickie, Executive Director of the Brain and Mind Research Institute at the University of Sydney reviewed the evidence regarding alcohol and the teenage brain and identified that alcohol can disrupt the brain development during the critical phase of growth that occurs from around 12–13 years of age until our early twenties.
 What a Great Night’; The Cultural Drivers and Drinking Practices among 14-24-year-old Australians: A consortium consisting of Monash and Deakin Universities undertook this research project to identify the most salient cultural drivers of low risk and risky alcohol consumption by Victorian youth, located in inner and outer suburban settings plus provincial and rural locations in Victoria.
 Expressions of Drunkenness (400 Rabbits): This book is the 10th in a scholarly series on alcohol in society published by the International Center for Alcohol Policies (ICAP) and provides an understanding of the historical origins of drunkenness; the biological explanations of intoxication; the language used to define this phenomenon; and modern-day drinking patterns.
  Sustaining a Reduction of Alcohol-Related Harms in the Licensed Environment: A Practical Experiment to Generate New Evidence: This project was undertaken to develop a comprehensive prevention model that was capable of reducing alcohol-related violence and aggression, and a scientifically defensible research design to test the model in a variety of licensed environments in Australia and New Zealand.

Criticism 
Some health and academic commentators have noted that DrinkWise is the Australian version of the global alcohol industry-supported public relations organisations, following the example of the tobacco industry. In 2009 fifty-eight scientists and health professionals expressed their opposition to DrinkWise by signing a letter stating that they will not seek or accept funding from them, and called on other researchers and community agencies to consider their own positions. These researchers strongly oppose the perceived conflict of interest between a body that is linked to an industry that profits from the consumption of alcohol, and that also purports to funds research aimed at reducing alcohol-related harm.

In 2018 thousands of posters warning pregnant women about the dangers of alcohol have had to be removed from the walls of hospitals and GP clinics around Australia because they contained misleading and inaccurate information about the risks of drinking alcohol while pregnant. 
The posters were distributed by Tonic Health Media and were later replaced with updated posters.

See also

Alcohol in Australia

References

External links
 

Medical and health organisations based in Australia
Alcohol in Australia
2005 establishments in Australia
Organizations established in 2005